Rohrgraben is a river of Bavaria, Germany.

It is a right tributary of the Aisch after , a district of Bad Windsheim.

See also
List of rivers of Bavaria

References

Rivers of Bavaria
Rivers of Germany